was the founder and the first shogun of the Kamakura shogunate of Japan, ruling from 1192 until 1199. He was the husband of Hōjō Masako who acted as regent (shikken) after his death.

Yoritomo was the son of Minamoto no Yoshitomo and belonged to Seiwa Genji's prestigious Kawachi Genji family. After setting himself the rightful heir of the Minamoto clan, he led his clan against the Taira clan from his capital in Kamakura, beginning the Genpei War in 1180. After five years of war, he finally defeated the Taira clan in the Battle of Dan-no-ura in 1185. Yoritomo thus established the supremacy of the warrior samurai caste and the first shogunate (bakufu) at Kamakura, beginning the feudal age in Japan, which lasted until the mid-19th century.

Early Life

Yoritomo was the third son of Minamoto no Yoshitomo, heir of the Minamoto (Seiwa Genji) clan, and his official wife, Yura-Gozen, daughter of Fujiwara no Suenori, head of Atsuta Shrine and a member of the illustrious Fujiwara clan. Yoritomo was born in the family villa, on the western side of Atsuta Shrine, in Atsuta, Nagoya, Owari Province (present-day Seigan-ji). At that time Yoritomo's grandfather Minamoto no Tameyoshi was the head of the minamoto. His childhood name was Oniwakamaru (鬼武丸). He was a descendant of Emperor Seiwa.

In 1156, factional divisions in the court erupted into open warfare within the capital. The cloistered Emperor Toba and his son Emperor Go-Shirakawa sided with the son of Fujiwara regent Fujiwara no Tadazane, Fujiwara no Tadamichi as well as Taira no Kiyomori (heir of the Taira clan at the time), while Cloistered Emperor Sutoku sided with Tadazane's younger son, Fujiwara no Yorinaga. This is known as the Hōgen Rebellion.

The Minamoto clan were split. The head of the clan, Tameyoshi, sided with Sutoku. However, his son, Yoshitomo (father of Yoritomo), sided with Toba and Go-Shirakawa, as well as Kiyomori. In the end, the supporters of Go-Shirakawa won the civil war, thus ensuring victory for Yoshitomo and Kiyomori. Sutoku was placed under house arrest, and Yorinaga was fatally wounded in battle. Tameyoshi was executed by the forces of Yoshitomo. Nonetheless, Go-Shirakawa and Kiyomori were ruthless, and Yoshitomo found himself as the head of the Minamoto clan, while Yoritomo became the heir.

Yoritomo and the Minamoto clan descended from the imperial family on his father's side. Nonetheless, in Kyoto, the Taira clan, now under the leadership of Kiyomori, and the Minamoto clan, under the leadership of Yoshitomo, began to factionalize again.

Four years later, Kiyomori supported Fujiwara no Michinori, also known as Shinzei. However, Yoshitomo supported Fujiwara no Nobuyori. This was known as the Heiji Rebellion. Nonetheless, the Minamoto were not well prepared, and the Taira took control of Kyoto. Shinzei's mansion was attacked by the Taira; Shinzei escaped, only to be captured and decapitated shortly thereafter. The Taira then burned the ex-emperor's palace, defeating the Minamoto. Yoshitomo fled the capital but was later betrayed and executed by a retainer.

In the aftermath, harsh terms were imposed on the Minamoto and their allies. Only Yoshitomo's three young boys remained alive, so that Kiyomori and the Taira clan were now the undisputed leaders of Japan.  Yoritomo, the new head of the Minamoto, was not executed by Kiyomori because of pleas from Kiyomori's stepmother but was exiled. Yoritomo's brothers, Minamoto no Noriyori and Minamoto no Yoshitsune were also allowed to live.

Yoritomo grew up in exile. He married into the Hōjō clan, led by Hōjō Tokimasa, marrying Tokimasa's daughter, Hōjō Masako. Meanwhile, he was notified of events in Kyoto.

Family
Parents 

 Father: Minamoto no Yoshitomo (源 義朝, 1123 – February 11, 1160)
 Mother: Yura Gozen (由良御前, d. 1159), dauhhter of Fujiwara no Suenori (藤原 季範)
Consorts and issues
Possible Wife: Yaehime (八重姫), daughter of Itō Sukechika (伊東 祐親)
Chizurumaru (千鶴丸), possible  first son 
Wife: Hōjō Masako (北条 政子, 1156 – August 16, 1225), daughter of Hōjō Tokimasa (北条 時政)
Ohime (大姫, 1178 – August 28, 1197), Fiance of Minamoto no Yoshitaka (源 義高), first daughter
Minamoto no Yoriie (Japanese: 源 頼家, September 11  1182 – August 14, 1204), first son
Lady Mihata (三幡, 1186 – July 24, 1199), second daughter
Minamoto no Sanetomo (源 実朝, September 12  1192 – February 12, 1219, r. 1203–1219), third son
Concubine: Kame no Mae (亀の前)
Concubine: Daishin no Tsubone (大進局), daughter of Date Tomomune (伊達朝宗)
Jōgyō (貞暁, March 18, 1186 – May 27, 1231 ), also known as Kamamura Hōin (鎌倉法印), second son

Call to arms and the Genpei War (1180–1185)

In 1180 Prince Mochihito, a son of Cloistered Emperor Go-Shirakawa, made a national call to arms of the Minamoto clan all over Japan to rebel against the Taira. Yoritomo took part in this, especially after tensions escalated between the Taira and Minamoto after the death of Minamoto no Yorimasa and Prince Mochihito himself.

Yoritomo established himself as the rightful heir of the Minamoto clan and set up a capital in Kamakura to the east. Not all Minamoto thought of Yoritomo as rightful heir, however. His uncle, Minamoto no Yukiie, and his cousin Minamoto no Yoshinaka, conspired against him.

In September 1180, Yoritomo was defeated at the Battle of Ishibashiyama, his first major battle, when Ōba Kagechika led a rapid night attack.
After his defeat in Mt. Ishibashiyama, Minamoto no Yoritomo fled into the Hakone mountains, stayed in Yugawara, then escaped from Manazuru-Iwa to Awa (south of present-day Chiba). Yoritomo spent the next six months raising a new army.

Taira no Kiyomori died in 1181 and the Taira clan was now led by Taira no Munemori. Munemori took a much more aggressive policy against the Minamoto and attacked Minamoto bases from Kyoto in the Genpei War. Nonetheless, Yoritomo was well protected in Kamakura.

His brothers Minamoto no Yoshitsune and Minamoto no Noriyori defeated the Taira in several battles, but they could not stop Minamoto no Yoshinaka, Yoritomo's rival, from entering Kyoto in 1183 and chasing the Taira south. The Taira took Emperor Antoku with them. In 1184, the Minamoto replaced Antoku with Emperor Go-Toba as the new emperor.

From 1181 to 1184, a de facto truce with the Taira-dominated court allowed Yoritomo the time to build an administration of his own, centered on his military headquarters in Kamakura. In the end he triumphed over his rival cousins, who sought to steal control of the clan from him, and over the Taira, who suffered a terrible defeat at the Battle of Dan-no-ura in 1185. Yoritomo thus established the supremacy of the warrior samurai caste and the first bakufu (shogunate) at Kamakura, beginning the feudal age in Japan which lasted until the mid-19th century.

Later Years and Death

In December 1185, Go-Shirakawa granted Yoritomo the authority to collect the commissariat tax (the hyoro-mai or levy contribution of rice) and to appoint stewards (jito) and constables (shugo). Thus the Throne "handed to the leader of the military class effective jurisdiction in matters of land tenure and the income derived from agriculture".

In the summer of 1189, Yoritomo invaded and subjugated Mutsu Province and Dewa Province. In December 1190 Yoritomo took up residence in his Rokuhara mansion at the capital, the former headquarters of the Taira clan. Upon the death of Go-Shirakawa in the spring of 1192, Go-Toba commissioned Yoritomo Sei-i Tai Shōgun (Generalissimo). Thus a feudal state was now organized in Kamakura while Kyoto was relegated to the role of "national ceremony and ritual".

Yoritomo gathered his gokenin in May 1193 and arranged a grand hunting event, Fuji no Makigari. On May 16, Yoritomo's 12-year-old son Yoriie shot a deer for the first time. Hunting was stopped and a festival was held in the evening. Yoritomo rejoiced in his son's achievement and sent a messenger to his wife Masako, but Masako sent the messenger back, saying that a military commander's son being able to shoot a deer is nothing to celebrate.

The Revenge of the Soga Brothers took place on May 28 of the same year at the Fuji no Makigari hunting event. The brothers Soga Sukenari and Soga Tokimune murdered the killer of their father, Kudō Suketsune. The brothers managed to kill 10 other participants until Nitta Tadatsune killed Sukenari. Then, Tokimune raided Yoritomo's mansion attempting to attack Yoritomo, but was finally taken down by Gosho no Gorōmaru, thus saving Yoritomo from a possible assassination attempt and ending the massacre. After this, Yoritomo took Tokimune in for questioning and had him executed later.

Yoritomo was ordained as a Buddhist monk in 1199 and left his home. He received the Buddhist name Bukōshōgendaizenmon (武皇嘯厚大禅門). He died two days later at the age of 51.

Appearance and Personality 
According to The Tale of Heiji, Yoritomo was "more adult-like than others of his age", and the figure of a young warrior Yoritomo appears in the picture scroll of The Tale of Heiji. Genpei Jōsuiki describes Yoritomo saying "his face is large and appearance is beautiful." The imperial messenger Nakahara no Yasusada, who met Yoritomo in Kamakura in August 1183, said that "he is short and his face is large, his appearance is graceful and language is civilized."

Kujō no Kanezane writes in his diary Tamaha that "Yoritomo's body is of rigorous power, and his fierce nature is accompanied with a clear distinction and firm resolution of the judgement of right and wrong." Yoritomo practiced shudō with Yoshinao, a member of the Imperial Guard.

Historian Hideo Kuroda organized and examined the portraits and statues of Minamoto no Yoritomo and has concluded as follows. When comparing the statues of Minamoto no Yoritomo in Higashihirozo and Hōjō Tokiyori in Kenchō-ji, from the facial expression to size, they are almost identical, and there is evidence that the kariginu was remodeled into a sokutai, the formal dress of the shogun, by adding a hirao and sekitai. Kuroda argues that the statue was originally a statue of Hōjō Tokiyori sculpted in Kamakura in the 14th century, but after the original statue of Yoritomo was lost, an altered statue of Tokiyori was used as a replacement. On the other hand, he considers the inscription on the statue of Minamoto no Yoritomo in Kai Province, Zenkō-ji to be the name of the repairer instead of the name of the sculptor, and that it was made at the request of Hōjō Masako in the first quarter of the 13th century. Thus, Kuroda concludes that this statue is the only accurate depiction of Minamoto no Yoritomo.

Legacy

In the words of George Bailey Sansom, "Yoritomo was a truly great man … his foresight was remarkable, but so was his practical good sense in setting up machinery to match his own expanding power."

Yoritomo's wife's family, the Hōjō, took control after his death at Kamakura, maintaining power over the shogunate until 1333, under the title of shikken (regent to the shōgun). One of his brothers-in-law was Ashikaga Yoshikane.

The stone pagoda traditionally believed to be his grave is still maintained today, adjacent to Shirahata Shrine, a short distance from the spot believed to be the site of the so-called Ōkura Bakufu, his shogunate's administrative-governmental offices.

Cultural references
He appears as a hero unit in Age of Empires II: The Age of Kings, and as a hero unit in Total War: Shogun 2.

A character named "Yoritomo" appears in Book 6: "The Lords of the Rising Sun" in the Fabled Lands adventure gamebook series, where Yoritomo is the self-proclaimed shōgun and on the verge of war with "Lord Kiyomori".

He appears as the final boss in Genpei Toma Den, an arcade game created by Namco in which the player character is Taira no Kagekiyo, another Japanese historical figure.

He also appears as a prominent character in the 2021 anime series The Heike Story.

Eras of Yoritomo's bakufu
The years in which Yoritomo was shōgun are more specifically identified by more than one era name or nengō.
 Kenkyū (1190–1199)
 Shōji (1199–1201)

See also

 Seiwa Genji
 Eiji Yoshikawa, historical fiction writer
Battle of Hojuji

Notes

References
 Mass, Jeffrey P. (1999). Yoritomo and the Founding of the First Bakufu: the Origins of Dual Government in Japan. Stanford: Stanford University Press. ; OCLC 41712279
 Nagahara Keiji 永原慶二. Minamoto no Yoritomo 源頼朝. Tokyo: Iwanami-shoten, 1995.
 Naramoto Tatsuya 奈良本辰也, et al. Minamoto no Yoritomo 源頼朝. Tokyo: Shisakusha, 1972.
 Nussbaum, Louis-Frédéric and Käthe Roth. (2005).  Japan Encyclopedia. Cambridge: Harvard University Press. ; OCLC 58053128
 Titsingh, Isaac. (1834). Nihon Ōdai Ichiran; ou,  Annales des empereurs du Japon.  Paris: Royal Asiatic Society, Oriental Translation Fund of Great Britain and Ireland. OCLC 5850691.
 Yamaji Aizan 山路愛山. Minamoto no Yoritomo: jidai daihyō Nihon eiyūden 源頼朝: 時代代表日本英雄伝. Tokyo: Heibonsha, 1987.
 Yoshikawa, Eiji. (1989)  Yoshikawa Eiji Rekishi Jidai Bunko (Eiji Yoshikawa's Historical Fiction), Vols. 41–42: Minamoto Yoritomo (源頼朝). Tokyo: Kodansha.

External links
 Ōmachi, by the Kamakura Citizen's Net, accessed on September 30, 2008
 Atsuta History Course, (include "Seigan-ji Temple" Birthplace of Minamoto-no Yoritomo)

1147 births
1199 deaths
12th-century Japanese people
12th-century shōguns
Kamakura shōguns
Samurai
People from Nagoya
People of Heian-period Japan
People of the Genpei War
People of Kamakura-period Japan
Kamakura period Buddhist clergy
Minamoto clan
City founders
Deified Japanese people
Kabuki characters